Events in the year 1803 in Norway.

Incumbents
Monarch: Christian VII

Events
 1 January – Denmark-Norway abolishes transatlantic slave trade.
 June - Anders Olson Lysne is executed for Lèse majesté. He is the last person executed for Lèse majesté in Norway.

Arts and literature

 The construction of Ledaal is finished.

Births
27 September – Hans Jørgen Darre, clergyman (died 1874)

Full date unknown
1 September – Georg Pettersen, politician (died 1879)
Per Ivarson Undi, early homesteader in Wisconsin Territory (died 1860)

Deaths
15 March - Johann Friedrich von und zu Mansbach, military officer  (born 1744)
14 April - Johan Christian Schønheyder, bishop (born 1742)
22 May – Frederik Otto Scheel, military officer and civil servant (born 1748).
June - Anders Olson Lysne, leader of a farmer rebellion (born 1764)
15 October – Ole Irgens, bishop (born 1724)
18 November – Ditlevine Feddersen, culture personality  (born 1727)
24 November – Reier Gjellebøl, priest and writer (born 1737).

See also

References